Mengalum Island is an island located on the West Coast Division of Sabah in the South China Sea on Malaysia. The island is among popular destination for Chinese tourists to Sabah.

2017 Chinese tourist boat mishap 

On 28 January 2017, three Chinese nationals died while 22 others rescued after their boat sunk in the sea while on their way to visiting the island.

See also 
 List of islands of Malaysia

References

External links 
 Sabah Tourism, see Mengalum Island

Islands of Sabah